Arnhild Lauveng (born 13 January 1972) is a Norwegian psychologist.

Personal life
Lauveng had schizophrenia from the age of 17. She spent 10 years in various institutions. When she recovered she studied psychology at the University of Oslo, and now works as a clinical psychologist. In her autobiographical memoir A Road Back from Schizophrenia she describes her life at the hospital ward.

Awards
Fritt Ord Honorary Award (2008)

Selected publications
 I morgen var jeg alltid en løve, Cappelen Damm (2005)
 A Road Back from Schizophrenia: A Memoir, Skyhorse Publishing (2012)

References

1972 births
Living people
Norwegian psychologists